Pampatherium is an extinct genus of xenarthran that lived in the Americas during the Pleistocene. Some species went extinct right at the Pleistocene-Holocene border.

Distribution
Pampatherium humboldtii and P. typum lived in South America (mostly Brazil) during the Pleistocene, with P. humboldtii surviving into the very Late Pleistocene.

Pampatherium mexicanum was the only North American species, reaching as far north as Sonora, Mexico. It lived during the Rancholabrean.

Description
Pampatherium resembled a very large armadillo. Pampatheres generally resembled armadillos, particularly in the shape of it skull, long snout, and the presence of three areas on the carapace (movable bands, scapular and pelvic shields). Among the features that distinguish them from armadillos are their posterior teeth, which are bilobate rather than peg-like. Their endocranial morphology is also similar to glyptodonts.

The osteoderms of Pampatherium have little ornamentation, lack a depressed marginal band, and those from the posterior buckler are mostly rectangular.

Pampatherium is thought to have excavated paleoburrows and would have both fought with and have been preyed upon by Arctotherium angustidens in these dens.

References

Prehistoric cingulates
Pleistocene xenarthrans
Pleistocene mammals of North America
Fossils of Mexico
Pleistocene mammals of South America
Prehistoric mammal genera
Fossil taxa described in 1875
Taxa named by Florentino Ameghino